Silvestre Revueltas Sánchez (December 31, 1899 – October 5, 1940) was a Mexican composer of classical music, a violinist and a conductor.

Life

Revueltas was born in Santiago Papasquiaro in Durango, and studied at the National Conservatory in Mexico City, St. Edward's University in Austin, Texas, and the Chicago College of Music. He gave violin recitals and in 1929 was invited by Carlos Chávez to become assistant conductor of the National Symphony Orchestra of Mexico, a post he held until 1935. He and Chávez did much to promote contemporary Mexican music. It was around this time that Revueltas began to compose in earnest. He began his first film score, Redes, in 1934, a commission which resulted in Revueltas and Chávez falling out. Chávez had originally expected to write the score, but political changes led to him losing his job in the Ministry of Education, which was behind the film project. Revueltas left Chávez's orchestra in 1935 to be the principal conductor of a newly created and short-lived rival orchestra, the Orquesta Sinfónica Nacional.

He was part of a family of artists, a number of whom were also famous and recognized in Mexico: his brother Fermín (1901–1935) and sister Consuelo (born before 1908, died before 1999) were painters, sister Rosaura (ca. 1909–1996) was an actress and dancer, and younger brother José Revueltas (1914–1976) was a noted writer. His daughter from his first marriage to Jules Klarecy (née Hlavacek), Romano Carmen (later Montoya and Peers), enjoyed a successful career as a dancer, taught ballet and flamenco in New York, and died on November 13, 1995, at age 73, in Athens, Greece. She is survived by three sons, and two kindred creative female heirs in Oceanside, California. His daughter from his second marriage, Eugenia (born November 15, 1934), is an essayist. His nephew Román Revueltas Retes, son of José, is a violinist, journalist, painter and conductor of the Orquesta Sinfónica de Aguascalientes (OSA).

In 1937 Revueltas went to Spain during the Spanish Civil War, as part of a tour organized by the leftist organization Liga de Escritores y Artistas Revolucionarios (LEAR); upon Francisco Franco's victory, he returned to Mexico. He earned little, and fell into poverty and alcoholism. He died in Mexico City of pneumonia (complicated by alcoholism), at the age of 40 on October 5, 1940, the day his ballet El renacuajo paseador, written four years earlier, was premiered. His remains are kept at the Rotonda de los Hombres Ilustres in Mexico City.

Works
Revueltas wrote film music, chamber music, songs, and a number of other works. His best-known work is the 1960 arrangement by  drawn from Revueltas' film score for the 1939 film La noche de los mayas, although some dissenting opinions hold that the orchestral work Sensemayá is better known. In any case, it is Sensemayá that is considered Revueltas's masterpiece.

He appeared briefly as a bar piano player in the movie ¡Vámonos con Pancho Villa! (Let's Go with Pancho Villa, Mexico, 1935), for which he composed the music. When shooting breaks out in the bar while he is playing "La Cucaracha", he holds up a sign reading "Se suplica no tirarle al pianista" ("Please don't shoot the pianist").

Music

Chamber works 
El afilador, 1924
Batik, 1926
Four Little Pieces for two violins and cello, 1929
String Quartet No. 1, 1930
String Quartet No. 2, 1931
String Quartet No. 3, 1931
String Quartet No. 4, Música de feria, 1932
Tres piezas, for violin and piano, 1932
Tres pequeñas piezas serias, for quintet of mixed winds, 1932–33
Ocho x radio, 1933
Planos, 1934
Homenaje a Federico García Lorca, 1936
Éste era un rey 1940
First Little Serious Piece, for chamber ensemble, 1940
Second Little Serious Piece, for chamber ensemble, 1940

Orchestral works 
Pieza para orquesta, 1929
Cuauhnáhuac, for string orchestra, 1931; revised for full orchestra, 1931; revised again for full orchestra 1932
Esquinas, 1931 (rev. 1933)
Ventanas, 1931
Alcancías, 1932
Colorines, for chamber orchestra, 1932
Janitzio, 1933 (rev. 1936)
Toccata (sin fuga), for violin and chamber orchestra 1933
Troka, 1933
Caminos, 1934
Danza geométrica (orchestral version of Planos), 1934
Sensemayá, 1938
Itinerarios, 1938
Música para charlar, 1938 (from the film score of Ferrocarriles de Baja California)

Ballets
El renacuajo paseador, 1936
La coronela, 1939 (unfinished; orch. by Moncayo, arr. by Limantour; also completed by Blas Galindo and Candelario Huízar, lost)

Film scores 
Redes, 1935
¡Vámonos con Pancho Villa!, 1936
El indio, 1938
Ferrocarriles de Baja California, 1938
selections reworked as Música para charlar
Bajo el signo de la muerte, 1939
La noche de los mayas (Night of the Mayas), 1939
Los de abajo, 1940, directed by Chano Urueta, based on the 1920 novel by Mariano Azuela
¡Que viene mi marido!, 1940

Songs 
Duo para pato y canario, voice and chamber orchestra, 1931
"Ranas" (Frogs) and "El tecolote" (The Owl), voice and piano, 1931
Caminando, 1937
"Canto a una muchacha negra" (words: Langston Hughes), voice and piano 1938
Cinco canciones para niños y dos canciones profanas, 1938–1939

Piano
Adagio
Tragedia en forma de rábano (no es plagio)
Allegro
Canción (a passage used also in Cuauhnáhuac)

See also
 Daniel Ayala Pérez – studied violin with Revueltas

References

Sources

Further reading
Avila, Jacqueline A. 2007."The Influence of the Cinematic in the Music of Silvestre Revueltas". DMA thesis. University of California (Riverside).
 Barnard Baca, Roberto. 2008. "The String Quartets of Silvestre Revueltas." DMA diss. New York: CUNY GC.
 Barnard Baca, Roberto. 2008. "Análisis de transformaciones en el cuarteto núm. 1 de Revueltas". Artículo. Guadalajara, Mexico
 Dean, Jack Lee. 1992. "Silvestre Revueltas: A Discussion of the Background and Influences Affecting His Compositional Style". Ph.D thesis. University of Texas at Austin.
 Espinosa, Sergio. 2001. "Silvestre Revuelta's Film for Redes". Ph.D. diss. University of Iowa.
 Fanning, Richard. 2006. "The Rhetorical Use of the Trumpet in the Music of Silvestre Revueltas, An Introduction". DM document. Indiana University.
 Garland, Peter. 1991. In Search of Silvestre Revueltas. Essays 1978–1990. Soundings Press.
 Hyslop, J. R. 1982. "An Analysis of Silvestre Revueltas's Sensemayá". DMA thesis. Bloomington: University of Indiana.
 Kaufman, Christopher. 1991. "Sensemayá: The Layer Procedures of Silvestre Revueltas". DMA thesis. Ithaca, New York: Cornell University.
 Kolb Neuhaus, Roberto. 2006. "El vanguardismo de Silvestre Revueltas: una perspectiva semiótica". DHA diss. Facultad de Filosofía y Letras, Universidad Nacional Autónoma de México (UNAM)
 Kolb Neuhaus, Roberto. 1998. Silvestre Revueltas. Catálogo de sus obras. Coyoacán, D.F.: Universidad Nacional Autónoma de México, Escuela Nacional de Música. 
Kolb Neuhaus, Roberto. 2014. "La noche de los mayas: crónica de una performance de otredad exótica". Trans (Revista Transcultural de Música), no. 18 (October).  (accessed 16 July 2017).
 Kolb Neuhaus, Roberto, and José Wolffer (eds.). 2007. Silvestre Revueltas: sonidos en rebelión. México: UNAM, Escuela Nacional de Música. 
 Leclair, Charmaine Francoise. 1995. "The Solo and Chamber Music of Silvestre Revueltas." Ph.D. diss. Eugene: University of Oregon.
 Mayer-Serra, Otto. 1941. "Silvestre Revueltas and Musical Nationalism in Mexico." The Musical Quarterly 27:123–145.
 Moreno Rivas, Yolanda. 1995. Rostros del Nacionalismo en la música mexicana: un ensayo de interpretación, 2nd edition. [México, D.F.]: Universidad Nacional Autónoma de México, Escuela Nacional de Música. 
 Porrit, Peter. 1983. "Nationalism in Twentieth Century Mexican Music". DMA thesis. Berkeley: University of California.
 Revueltas, Silvestre. 1989. Silvestre Revueltas por él mismo: apuntes autobiográficos, diarios, correspondencia y otros escritos de un gran músico, compiled by Rosaura Revueltas. México, D.F.: Ediciones Era. 
 Sanchez-Gutierrez, Carlos Daniel. 1996. ¨The Cooked and the Raw: Syncretism in the Music of Silvestre Revueltas". Ph.D. thesis. Princeton: Princeton University.
 Teibler-Vondrak, Antonia. 2011. Silvestre Revueltas: Musik für Bühne und Film'''. Wien: Böhlau Verlag. 
 Vondrak, Antonia. 2000. "Silvestre Revueltas (1899–1940)". DMA thesis. University of Vienna.
 Wilson-Spinalle, Katheleen L. 1983. "Selected Solo Songs of Carlos Chávez and Silvestre Revueltas. DMA thesis. University of Arizona.
 Zohn-Muldoon, Ricardo. 1998. "The Song of the Snake: Silvestre Revueltas' Sensemayá." Latin American Music Review / Revista de Música Latinoamericana 19, no. 2 (Autumn): 133–159.

External links

Silvestre Revueltas web site at National Autonomous University of Mexico ((UNAM)). 
Foro Virtual Silvestre Revueltas, UNAM. 
Del Sol Quartet: Tear includes Revueltas' Musica de Feria'' (1932) performed by Del Sol Quartet
Silvestre Revueltas at Epdlp 
Peermusic classical : Composer Silvestre Revueltas at www.peermusicclassical.com Silvestre Revueltas' web site at Peer Music Classical.
Silvestre Revueltas at www.wwnorton.com

 

1899 births
1940 deaths
20th-century classical composers
20th-century conductors (music)
20th-century classical violinists
20th-century male musicians
Mexican classical composers
Mexican male classical composers
Mexican film score composers
Mexican conductors (music)
Mexican classical violinists
Academic staff of the National Conservatory of Music of Mexico
Ballet composers
Male film score composers
Male conductors (music)
Male classical violinists
Musicians from Durango
National Conservatory of Music of Mexico alumni
People from Santiago Papasquiaro
Writers from Durango
Alcohol-related deaths in Mexico
Deaths from pneumonia in Mexico